Sociology of Rulership and Religion is a book written by Maximilian Weber, a German economist and sociologist. The original edition was in German. The book examines the hierarchic structures in religion and how these relate to political theories of governance and economics.

See also 
 Religion
 Sociology

References

External links
Online ebook of Sociology of Rulership and Religion

Sociology books
Works by Max Weber